Integrated Administration and Control System (IACS) makes it possible to develop direct and indirect (datawarehouse for animals, land, applicants, control and administration processes) system modules. It constitutes the basis for agricultural grants from the EU.

More info: The Integrated Administration and Control System 

Institutions of the European Union